This article lists all the Members of Parliament (députés) who were newly elected in their own right to the 16th legislature of the French National Assembly in the 2022 legislative election.

List

References 

Lists of new members of legislatures
2022 French legislative election
Lists of members of the National Assembly (France)